Andrei Vladimirovich Sibiryakov (February 28, 1964 – August 5, 1991), known as The Maniac from Lenenergo (was a Soviet serial killer who killed 5 people in 1988.

Biography 
Sibiryakov was born in Leningrad on February 28, 1964. At a minor age, he was first convicted of hooliganism, and after release he married. The absence of any prospects and reluctance to work, eventually led Sibiryakov on the criminal path. By the time of the attacks and murder series, he lived in the city of Pushkin (a municipal town in St. Petersburg). Subsequently, the interior minister of the homicide department of the Central Internal Affairs Directorate of St. Petersburg, Alexander Malyshev, who directly participated in the investigation of Sibiryakov's crimes, said the following about him: Sibiryakov was characterized as extremely cowardly, being too afraid to confess to his wife that he had been fired from his job for absenteeism. Every day he spent hours walking around Pushkin, and after some time stumbled upon the burial site of Grigori Rasputin. According to Sibiryakov, at that moment he felt that he deserved more in his life, and afterwards came more than once to Rasputin's grave. He decided that at this point he gets "energy feeding".

Sibiryakov committed assaults in the same way: he introduced himself as an employee of the municipal engineering company "Lenenergo", then penetrated into apartments where there were only single women, killing and robbing them afterwards. In just a few weeks, he committed six attacks: five of them (on Nadezhda Mironovich, Elena Aleksandrova, two women named Deyeva and Valentinova, and Tatyana Pavlova) were fatal. In one more case, the victim, Viktoria Bodumyan, miraculously survived, because, after striking her with a knife, the killer broke the handle. During another attack, Sibiryakov was frightened off, and did not manage to finish the crime. His modus operandi in many respects was similar to that of Vladimir Ionesyan, who had murdered 25 years before.

Arrest 
When he learned that his crimes were on the popular TV show "600 Seconds", Sibiryakov was so filled with pride for what he had done and, believing in his own impunity, sent an anonymous letter to the Central Internal Affairs Directorate of Leningrad demanding 50,000 rubles for stopping the crimes. He demanded an answer through the same telecast.

In one of the issues, the presenter of "600 Seconds" Alexander Nevzorov said: The next day, Sibiryakov called and appointed a meeting point on the railway platform "Prospect Glory" in Pushkin. He dressed in construction clothes and wore a helmet, which remained from his previous job. Snatching money from the police car, the killer rushed to get away, crossing the railway tracks right in front of a train in order to escape law enforcement officers. However, on the other side, there was an on-duty policeman who rushed after him in pursuit. They noticed that the killer disappeared into a basement, and blocked him. At the time he changed clothes in the basement and tried to get out of the entrance, but was detained. Soon after his arrest, the killer confessed to his crimes. At his home, most of the stolen items were found, and Sibiryakov's neighbors subsequently seized gold items which had been robbed from them.

The court sentenced Andrei Sibiryakov to death, and he was executed by firing squad on 5 August 1991 .

See also
 List of Russian serial killers

References 

1964 births
1991 deaths
Executed Soviet serial killers
Male serial killers
People executed by the Soviet Union by firing squad
People executed for murder
Year of death uncertain